Newark Hospital is a health facility in Newark-on-Trent, Nottinghamshire, England. It is managed by the Sherwood Forest Hospitals NHS Foundation Trust.

History

The hospital has its origins in a workhouse established in Hawton Road (now Albert Street) in 1786. The workhouse infirmary, which was established in the early 19th century, merged with the local dispensary to become became Newark Hospital and Dispensary in 1868.

The hospital moved to larger facilities, designed by William Bliss, on a site on London Road in April 1881. This released the old hospital site for redevelopment as the Castle Brewery. The hospital joined the National Health Service as Newark General Hospital in 1948.

The old Newark General hospital on London Road closed in 1996, after patients had been transferred to a modern healthcare facility on Boundary Road which was opened by the Duke of Gloucester in 1996.

See also
 List of hospitals in England

References

Hospital buildings completed in 1996
NHS hospitals in England
Newark-on-Trent
Hospitals in Nottinghamshire
Poor law infirmaries